Adriana Martín Santamaría (born 7 November 1986), commonly known as Adriana, is a Spanish international footballer who plays as a forward for Lazio. She previously played for Chelsea Ladies in England and Western New York Flash and Sky Blue FC in the United States, as well as Atlético Madrid, FC Barcelona, CE Sabadell, RCD Espanyol, Rayo Vallecano, Levante UD and Málaga CF in Spain. She has won three Spanish leagues and two national cups, and was the league's top scorer in 2007, 2010, and 2015.

Playing career

Club
Adriana played in the Champions League with Espanyol and Rayo Vallecano, scoring 10 goals in 12 games.

In August 2012, Adriana agreed to play the last six games of the FA WSL season with Chelsea Ladies. In early 2013, she signed with the Western New York Flash for the inaugural season of the NWSL. She played for Levante from 2014 to 2017.

In the summer of 2017, she signed with Málaga CF of the Spanish Segunda División. She was the first signing under new coach Antonio Contreras, who she had also played under at Levante.

Adriana agreed to sign for Lazio in July 2020. She scored 26 goals in 26 games to secure the club's promotion to Serie A.

International
Adriana has been a longstanding member of the Spanish national team. In the qualification stage for the 2011 World Cup she scored 16 goals.

In October 2012 Adriana scored in Spain's 3–2 extra time win over Scotland in the second leg of the UEFA Women's Euro 2013 qualifying play-off. The Spanish looked to be heading out when Veró Boquete had missed a penalty three minutes before hitting the winning goal on 122 minutes. Adriana had also scored Spain's goal in the first leg, a 1–1 draw at Hampden Park.

In June 2013, national team coach Ignacio Quereda confirmed Adriana as a member of his 23-player squad for the UEFA Women's Euro 2013 finals in Sweden. She was not named to the final Spanish roster for the 2015 FIFA Women's World Cup, despite being named on a preliminary 35-player roster.

References

External links
 
 Western New York Flash player profile
 Soccerway player profile
 

1986 births
Living people
People from Gúdar-Javalambre
Sportspeople from the Province of Teruel
Footballers from Aragon
Spanish women's footballers
Spain women's international footballers
Expatriate women's soccer players in the United States
NJ/NY Gotham FC players
Women's Super League players
Chelsea F.C. Women players
National Women's Soccer League players
Western New York Flash players
Women's Premier Soccer League Elite players
Primera División (women) players
FC Barcelona Femení players
RCD Espanyol Femenino players
CE Sabadell Femení players
Atlético Madrid Femenino players
Rayo Vallecano Femenino players
Women's association football forwards
Levante UD Femenino players
Málaga CF Femenino players
Spanish expatriate sportspeople in England
Expatriate women's footballers in England
Spanish expatriate sportspeople in the United States
S.S. Lazio Women 2015 players
Expatriate women's footballers in Italy
Spanish expatriate sportspeople in Italy
CF Pozuelo de Alarcón Femenino players
Spanish expatriate women's footballers
Women's Professional Soccer players
Spain women's youth international footballers
21st-century Spanish women